Tristan Tymen is a French model from Lyon and the winner of the 2015 Elite Model Look competition. He was the first French model to win the men's competition. Tymen then signed a three-year contract with Elite Model Management.

References 

French male models
Living people
Year of birth missing (living people)
People from Lyon
Elite Model Management models